Marmelópolis is a municipality in the state of Minas Gerais in the Southeast region of Brazil.

Geography 
It lies on the boundary of the state of São Paulo at 1277 meters elevation, having an area of 108,1 km² in the municipality.

The physical area is made up for the most part of mountainous terrain of The Mantiqueira Mountains. The name Mantiqueira derives from a [Tupi-Guarani] word meaning "mountains that cry", denoting the large number of springs and streams found there.
Part of Marins peak is located in Marmelópolis. This is a beautiful landscape with a peaceful mood on it.

Marmelópolis occupies a highly strategic geographical location, due to its proximity to São Paulo (260 km), Belo Horizonte (460 km) and Rio de Janeiro (420 km), whose connections are made with good highways.

Climate 
The climate is characterized by dry winters and mild summers. The winter is from April to September and has an average temperature of 15 °C and rainfall of 315 mm. The summer is from October to March and has an average temperature of 21 °C with rainfall of 1,430 mm. The annual rainfall is 1,745 mm. The average annual temperature is 17 °C with minimums of -6 °C and maximums of 31.7 °C.

See also 
 List of municipalities in Minas Gerais

References 

Municipalities in Minas Gerais